Nevada State College (NSC) is a public college in Henderson, Nevada.  It is part of the Nevada System of Higher Education and opened on September 3, 2002, as Nevada's first state college. Its main campus is located on a  site in the southern foothills of Henderson.

Nevada State College has around 3,300 undergraduate students from a variety of ethnic and cultural backgrounds. In terms of minority or underrepresented students at NSC, close to 20% of the student body is Hispanic/Latino, 11% is Black or African American, 10% is Asian, and 2% is Native Hawaiian/Pacific Islander. The college's average student age is 29, and 61% of its students attend part-time. The vast majority of Nevada State College's students are from Nevada.

Nevada State College's enrollment has grown from 177 students in 2002 to 3,389 in 2012, making it one of the fastest growing institutions of higher education in the country on a percentage basis. During this period, however, some of Nevada State College's programs suffered from lower than expected enrollments. However, enrollment for 2010 increased by 23.3% compared to the year before.

Nevada State College's six-year graduation rate in 2017 was 15.9%.  The average between 2008 and 2017 was 14.99%, with a high of 21.6% in 2011 and a low of 9.4% in 2009.  From 2004 to 2010, 1214 students have graduated from NSC, over 500 of them earning nursing degrees. Approximately 45% of Nevada State College's students are first-generation college students. An equivalent percentage are members of racial or ethnic minorities.

Campus activities and organizations include student government and a student-run newspaper, The Scorpions Tale. Nevada State College does not currently have any varsity sports teams, but it offers a few club sports.  The school's colors are black and gold and its mascot is a scorpion.

History

In 1999, the Nevada Legislature created the Advisory Committee to Examine Locating a 4-Year State College in Henderson, Nev. In December 1999, the Nevada Board of Regents approved the establishment of Nevada State College.

In February 2000, the committee recommended the new institution be named Nevada State College at Henderson. The committee members determined Henderson should be part of the official name as they felt additional state colleges would be created in the state.  Later that month, the Henderson City Council, after having evaluated several potential sites, voted to locate Nevada State College northeast of Lake Mead Drive and Boulder Highway that was to be part of The LandWell Company's Provenance master-planned community. In March, James Rogers, owner of several television stations and later chancellor of the Nevada System of Higher Education, agreed to chair the college's foundation.

Opponents of the creation of Nevada State College feared at the time that its creation would take resources from UNLV. However, proponents of the college argued the "proposed college would be up to $3,000 cheaper than educating them at the University of Nevada, Las Vegas.  The savings would come from smaller salaries for professors, who would teach four classes (per semester), rather than the three or fewer taught by UNLV professors."

In April 2000, the Board of Regents voted 8-3 to begin negotiations for the Boulder Highway / Lake Mead site despite some concerns that the site was near a permanent toxic waste storage facility.  The original site of the college, first proposed in 2000 and on approximately 300 acres northeast of Lake Mead Drive and Boulder Highway near downtown Henderson raised environmental concerns as it was approximately one mile from a toxic waste storage facility, which prompted the Nevada Board of Regents in 2001 to select the college's present day site located west of U.S. Highway 95 in what was once the Wagon Wheel Industrial Park. In June 2000, the Regents requested $5.2 million for start-up costs for the campus and $7 million for instruction costs for its first cohort of students in 2002-03 as well as $43.5 million for capital construction which was to include a library. Nevada Gov. Guinn's 2001-2003 executive budget, which was developed later in 2000, reduced the Regents' request by recommending "$22.8 million in state funding, 6.8 million to open it to 1,000 full-time students in the fall of 2002, and $16 million to help construct the first campus building."

Nevada State College opened in 2002. The college acquired accreditation, moved with its master plan for a  campus, and its first permanent building, the Liberal Arts and Sciences building, opened in August 2008. In 2008 Nevada State College launched a campus-wide recruitment and retention initiative. Between the Spring 2009 and Spring 2010 semesters, Nevada State College increased enrollment by over 20%, to over 2,600 students.

Among the different educational institutions of the NHSE, the largest 2009 budget cuts by the state legislature were for Nevada State College at 24.1%. Neighboring College of Southern Nevada had its budget cut by only 4.9%. Students protestested the cuts which left student services understaffed and about 25% of the university's teaching and administrative positions vacant in 2008. The Nevada System of Higher Education faced a $900 million budget deficit and there were proposals to close down Nevada State College along with other NHSE programs and schools.

Campus
Nevada State College's 509-acre site is located at the base of the McCullough mountain range in the southeastern corner of Henderson.  The site was conveyed from the Bureau of Land Management to the city of Henderson in November 2002 as part of the Clark County Conservation of Public Lands and Natural Resources Act of 2002.

The college opened its first permanent building, the Liberal Arts & Sciences Building, on its 509-acre site in August 2008. The  building has faculty offices, labs and seven classrooms. The building includes SMART classroom technologies which allow professors to use a wide array of audio and visual teaching techniques, and scientific equipment for educational use.

In addition to the Liberal Arts and Sciences Building, NSC has also opened the Bob and Allison Kasner Academic Building (formerly known as Nursing, Science, and Education) along with the James E. and Beverly Roger's Student Center. The future Christenson Education Building and the Student Village dorm buildings are currently under construction. NSC currently leases the Dawson building on Nevada State Dr. which was originally the only building when the college opened, and purchased the J. Russell and Carol Raker Student Success Center on Paradise Hills Dr. which contains the financial aid office and student advising. NSC no longer leases two auxiliary buildings in downtown Henderson on Water Street.

On-going campus planning activities
In 2010, the Nevada Board of Regents approved the college's campus master plan, which calls for the development of roughly six million square feet of academic, residential, retail, and cultural space by full campus build-out in order to accommodate 25,000-30,000 students.

Sustainability Initiatives
As it relates to sustainable planning and design, NSC's campus master plan is informed by three central goals: (1) achieve operational carbon neutrality, (2) become a model of sustainable development for the city, county and region, and (3) enable the campus to serve as a learning and training tool for topics related to sustainable development.

Academics
NSC's Board-approved mission is to provide "educational, social, cultural, economic and civic advancement to the citizens of Nevada. To this end, the college addresses the state's need for increased access to higher education through teaching practices and support services that promote the success of its largely first-generation, low income, under-represented student population. Nevada State College places special emphasis on meeting the state's need for highly skilled, well-educated teachers and nurses and offers a wide range of baccalaureate degree programs grounded in the liberal arts and sciences."

Accreditation
In August 2011, Nevada State College received independent accreditation at the baccalaureate degree level from the Northwest Commission on Colleges and Universities.  The Northwest Commission on Colleges and Universities approved NSC as a Candidate for Accreditation in July 2006. Since July 2006, Nevada State College has filed two comprehensive self-study reports with the Commission, and has undergone three comprehensive on-site visits by the Commission.  Since 2002, Nevada State College has been operating under the accreditation of the University of Nevada, Reno.

Tuition and financial aid
For the 2014-2015 academic year, Nevada residents will pay $148.50 per credit for tuition, plus student fees. Nevada State College offers financial aid in the form of grants, scholarships, and loans.

Degree programs
NSC offers 26 bachelor's degree programs and 16 minors.  In the Fall of 2008, Nevada State College launched Nevada's first bachelor of science degree in the education of the deaf and hard of hearing. The program addresses the deaf culture and its integration of deaf students into specific subject areas.

Nevada State College also partners with Touro University to accommodate students in Occupational Therapy. Through the partnership, students complete three years of their bachelor's degree in Occupational Therapy Science at Nevada State College, then transfer to Touro University for the final two years.

Faculty
As of the latest IPEDS Diversity Report, Nevada State College's full-time faculty is 34.2% ethnic/racial minorities which is the highest percentage of all of the Nevada System of Higher Education institutions.

Student enrollment
NSC enrolled 177 students in the fall of 2002; in the fall of 2010, the college enrolled 2,988 students.  For the fall of 2011, NSC enrolled 3,167 students, which represents a year-over-year six percent increase in student enrollments.

Degrees awarded
From 2004 (the first year in which students were eligible to graduate from NSC) to 2010, the college has graduated 1,214 students with the majority of degrees being awarded in the fields of nursing and education.

Academic units
The college's academic programs are housed in one of three schools: the School of Liberal Arts & Sciences, the School of Education, and the School of Nursing.

References

External links

Nevada System of Higher Education
Buildings and structures in Henderson, Nevada
Education in Henderson, Nevada
Public universities and colleges in Nevada
Educational institutions established in 2002
Universities and colleges accredited by the Northwest Commission on Colleges and Universities
Universities and colleges in Clark County, Nevada
2002 establishments in Nevada